Phrynocephalus maculatus, the blacktail toadhead agama or spotted toad-headed agama, is a species of agamid lizard Iran, Turkmenistan, Syria, Jordan, Iraq, Pakistan, Afghanistan, Pakistan, Saudi Arabia, Oman, United Arab Emirates, and Kuwait.

References

maculatus
Reptiles described in 1872
Taxa named by John Anderson (zoologist)